Evija is a Latvian female given name.

It may refer to:

People
 Evija Āzace (born 1976), Latvian basketball player
 Evija Papule, Latvian politician, a representative for Livonia (Saeima constituency)
 Evija Ručevska, Latvian beauty pageant contestant, Mis Latvija 1998, who withdrew from Miss World 1998 and competed at the Miss World 1999
 Evija Sloka, Latvian musician who competed to represent Latvia in the Eurovision Song Contest 2011
 Evija Smagare, songwriter whose song competed to represent Latvia in the Eurovision Song Contest 2022
 Evija Šulce (born 1970), Latvian luger
 Evija Tētiņa, Latvian hockey player who was named best goaltender at the 2014 IIHF Women's World Championship Division I

See also